That! Medical Quiz Show is a half-hour radio quiz show hosted by Dr. T. Glenn Pait and co-hosted by Lisa Cornwell that quizzes contestants on medically related issues and topics. It is produced in the US and broadcasts online and on various NPR affiliate stations.

Format 
That! Medical Quiz Show is a studio produced radio show, featuring three contestants per show who are quizzed by host Dr. T. Glenn Pait and co-host Lisa Cornwell. Contestants are usually not experienced in the medical field. After introductions, the first featured round begins, which differs every broadcast. There are a total of four rounds and all contestants have the chance to answer one question per round worth one point each and then a bonus round worth two points follows. Whoever accumulates the most points after the final and fast-paced bonus round, "Cardiac Capper," receives a gag prize. The playful gag prizes have ranged from alligator wrestling lessons to items like Dr. Pait's special pocket protector. Lisa then asks for a question for Dr. Pait to pull out of his "That! Medical Quiz Bag." He concludes each show with the catchphrase: "Until next time, remember that more medical knowledge means better health...because there's a little bit of doctor in all of us.™"

Rounds 
There are four rounds and all contestants have a chance to answer one question per round worth one point each. Dr. Pait asks the question and gives the contestants three choices to choose from. Each round has a specific sound effect which provides a quirky feel to the show.

It's all in the Brain 
Focuses on questions about the brain.

Bread & Brawn 
Deals with nutrition and exercise.

Gross Anatomy 
Covers gross medical topics.

Body Shop 
Concerns the anatomy of the human body.

Medical Disorders 
Explores the potential maladies that can sometimes befall the human race.

Bonus Rounds 
Bonus rounds are after every round for two points. Depending on the type of bonus round, contestants can buzz in if their peers answer incorrectly.

Medical Myths 
Includes a statement and contestants determine whether it is a medical myth or truth.

Survival Skills 
Concerns potentially dangerous situations that can occur at home, work, or in the great outdoors.

Inside the Trainer's Corner 
A new round introduced in Season 2 of the show to address topics of sport related injuries or athletes who have been injured.

The Lub Dub Pump 
A variety of topics covering the cardiovascular system.

Doctor vs. Quack 
Dr. Pait makes a statement and contestants determine if the statement he makes is one a real doctor would make or that would come from a phony doctor, a quack.

Ultra Sounds 
The show plays a medically related sound, something contestants might hear in a hospital, a doctor's office, or in the human body. Contestants try to identify sounds that range from a whooping cough to the squeaky wheels of a hospital bed.

Illnesses of the Rich and Famous 
Dr. Pait reads a description of a medical condition that has affected a public figure. Contestants will have to determine which disorder is described from the choices presented.

Cardiac Capper 
A "lightning round" of five fast-paced True or False questions or statements.

References

External links 
 http://www.thatmedicalquizshow.com/
 https://www.facebook.com/ThatMQS
 http://www.publicbroadcasting.net/kuar/.jukebox?action=viewPodcast&podcastId=21870
 http://www.prx.org/series/33125-that-medical-quiz-show
 https://archive.today/20130620044654/http://www.thv11.com/news/article/203854/0/Dr-Pait-hosts-That-Medical-Quiz-Show
 https://web.archive.org/web/20121114133407/http://orthostreams.com/2012/11/list-of-19-spine-surgeons-who-have-recently-written-books/
 https://www.aamc.org/newsroom/reporter/may09/88864/may09_backpage.html
 https://books.google.com/books/about/Golf_Forever.html?id=Cv0VULueRCsC

NPR programs
American radio game shows
Quiz shows
2012 radio programme debuts